Adam George Dyment (born August 1981), better known by his stage name Duke Dumont, is an English DJ and record producer. He is best known for his hit singles "Need U (100%)" "I Got U",  "Ocean Drive" and "Won't Look Back" which both reached number one and number two on the UK Singles Chart respectively. He founded the record label called Blasé Boys Club and has also used it as an alias for production. He has remixed a number of songs, including several which have charted in the United Kingdom. In 2014, "Need U (100%)", was nominated for "Best Dance Recording" for the 56th Annual Grammy Awards. Next year, "I Got U" was nominated in the same category.

Biography

2007–2011: Career beginnings
Duke's early career was mentored by Switch (who has produced for Beyoncé, M.I.A., Santigold) and he made his name remixing pop songs, including Lily Allen's "The Fear", Mystery Jets' "Two Doors Down" and Bat for Lashes' "Daniel".

In March 2007, he released his first EP, the Regality EP for Turbo Recordings which was followed in August 2008 by The Dominion Dubs EP on Dubsided. Duke mixed the 2010 FabricLive.51 compilation album for Fabric.

In 2011, he moved out of London to the Hertfordshire countryside to focus on original material.

2012–2019: Breakthrough
In 2012, Duke released two EPs on Tiga's Turbo Recordings, For Club Play Only Vol. 1 and Vol. 2, which were played on radio by Annie Mac and Fearne Cotton on BBC Radio 1 and Trevor Nelson on BBC Radio 1Xtra. In the same year, he remixed AlunaGeorge's "Your Drums, Your Love" and Santigold's "The Keepers".

On 31 March 2013, Dumont released the single, "Need U (100%)". The song features vocals from Sierra Leonean-born British singer A*M*E. The song has topped the UK Singles Chart and also charted in Belgium and the Netherlands. The official music video, directed by Ian Robertson and starring Rique, has over 37 million YouTube views.

On 1 July 2013, Pitchfork premiered Duke Dumont's new album track, "Hold On", featuring vocals from British singer-songwriter MNEK.

On 6 December 2013, Annie Mac premiered Duke Dumont's official single, "I Got U". The single was released as the second single from his forthcoming debut studio album in 2014. The single, "I Got U", reached number one on the UK Singles Chart. The song, samples the song, "My Love Is Your Love". Dumont was inspired by the original recording of the song by Whitney Houston, saying: "It's one of my favourite Whitney songs, especially the later Whitney period. It got to a point [during the recording process] where I thought maybe it might be worth bringing a singer in and changing it but I thought you know what, out of respect as [the track] started off working the song around "My Love Is Your Love" I kept it in."

In August 2014, Duke Dumont released "Won't Look Back", which reached number two on the UK Singles Chart.

In February 2015, "I Got U" was nominated for "Best Dance Recording" at the 57th Annual Grammy Awards.

At the end of July 2015, he released "Ocean Drive", from the EP, Blasé Boys Club Pt. 1.

On 15 July 2015, during an interview with Annie Mac on BBC Radio 1, Duke Dumont said that he would be releasing two new singles, "Be Here" and "Worship" from the EP, For Club Play Only Pt. 4. It was released by Defected Records on 1 August 2016.

2020: Debut album
Dumont's debut album, Duality, was released on 17 April 2020. In an interview with Billboard, Dumont said he waited so long into his career to release his first album because "it gave me an opportunity to make an album and a body of music that has an emotional impact." He continued, "There's a reason there's strings on a lot of the tracks. That's to give it a sense of longevity. There's a reason why the songs have chords and not just beats and synth lines. You've got to aspire to that long game."

Discography

Studio albums

Extended plays

Singles

Notes

Production credits

Remixes

See also 
 List of English musicians
 Blasé Boys Club, record company started by Dumont

References

External links
 

21st-century British musicians
English DJs
English record producers
English house musicians
Living people
Remixers
1981 births
People from the London Borough of Harrow
Electronic dance music DJs
Universal Music Group artists